Barry William Ninham AO DSc FAA (born 9 April 1936, Croydon, South Australia – ) is an Australian physicist who has received many awards for his research.

He studied at University of Western Australia where he received an M.Sc. in theoretical physics in 1957. In 1962, he received a Ph.D. in mathematical physics from University of Maryland, doing research in statistical mechanics with Elliott W. Montroll as thesis advisor.

From 1962 to 1970 he was lecturer, senior lecturer and finally associate professor at the Department of Applied Mathematics of the University of New South Wales. In 1970 he became professor of the newly formed Department of Applied Mathematics at the Institute of Advanced Studies of the Australian National University.

Ninham was elected a Fellow of the Australian Academy of Science in 1978, appointed an Officer of the Order of Australia in 2014, and awarded the Matthew Flinders Medal and Lecture in 2016.

References

Fellows of the Australian Academy of Science
Living people
1936 births
Australian physicists
Academic staff of the Australian National University
Officers of the Order of Australia
Recipients of the Centenary Medal